Jamie Ellis (born 4 October 1989) is an English professional rugby league footballer who plays as a  or  for the York City Knights in the RFL Championship. 

He has previously played for St Helens (Heritage № 1179), Leigh, Hull FC, Castleford Tigers (Heritage № 929), Hull Kingston Rovers and the Huddersfield Giants in the Super League. He has also spent time on loan from Huddersfield at Hull Kingston Rovers during 2017's Super League XXII, to which he returned on a 1-year deal for 2020's Super League XXV.

Background
Ellis was born in St Helens, Merseyside, England.

Early career
Ellis was as a youngster with the amateur team Chorley Panthers.

Playing career

St Helens
Ellis made his professional début in a 10–20 defeat by Salford City Reds in 2009's Super League XIV.

Leigh Centurions
At the end of 2010's Super League XV, Ellis left St. Helens, after falling out of favour with new coach Royce Simmons, and a run of bad injuries saw him leave the Super League side. He joined Championship outfit Leigh Centurions on a one-year contract.

Hull F.C.
In May 2011 it was confirmed that Ellis would be moving to Super League side Hull F.C. for the start of the 2012 campaign.

Castleford Tigers
In June 2012, Ellis signed a contract with the Castleford Tigers for the 2013 season where he then left at the end of 2014.

Ellis played in the 2014 Challenge Cup Final against Leeds at Wembley Stadium.

Huddersfield Giants
In October 2014, it was announced that he would join the Huddersfield Giants on a two-year deal starting in 2015.

Hull Kingston Rovers
In 2016 Ellis is signed onto a one-year loan to the Hull Kingston Rovers, citing Head Coach Tim Sheens' intentions of getting the Hull Kingston Rovers back into the Super League. On 6 December 2019 Ellis returned to the Hull Kingston Rovers on a one-year contract for 2020.

Castleford Tigers (re-join)
In 2017 Ellis signed again with Castleford on a three-year deal.

Leigh Centurions (re-join)
Ellis re-signed for Leigh for the 2021 season. He also spent a short two-week loan spell at York City Knights in Jun 2021.

York City Knights
On 30 September 2021 it was reported that he had signed for the York City Knights in the RFL Championship

References

External links

Castleford Tigers profile
Hull KR profile
SL profile
Saints Heritage Society profile

1989 births
Living people
Castleford Tigers players
English rugby league players
Huddersfield Giants players
Hull F.C. players
Hull Kingston Rovers players
Leigh Leopards players
Rugby league halfbacks
Rugby league players from St Helens, Merseyside
St Helens R.F.C. players
York City Knights players